Ferdinand Boschetti (born 1577) was a Roman Catholic prelate who served as Titular Archbishop of Diocaesarea in Palaestina (1622–1629?).

Biography
Ferdinand Boschetti was born in Modena, Italy in 1577.
On 2 May 1622, he was appointed during the papacy of Pope Gregory XV as Titular Archbishop of Diocaesarea in Palaestina.
On 17 May 1622, he was consecrated bishop by Bonifazio Bevilacqua Aldobrandini, Cardinal-Priest of Santa Maria in Trastevere, with Giulio Sansedoni, Bishop Emeritus of Grosseto, and Valerio Seta, Bishop of Alife, serving as co-consecrators.
It is uncertain when he died; Georg Hammer  was appointed the next Titular Archbishop of Diocaesarea in Palaestina in 1629.

Episcopal succession

References 

17th-century Roman Catholic titular bishops
Bishops appointed by Pope Gregory XV
1577 births